The German Embassy School Tehran (DBST) is a German international school in Tehran which was founded in 1980 as a successor to the German School Tehran, which was once the largest German school abroad.  The school serves kindergarten through Sekundarstufe II (senior high school). There is an international section serving nursery through class 8.

It shares its campus with the former British School, Tehran (BST). After the BST's closure in 2011, the DBST acquired the BST's assets and established an international section operating in the former BST campus. It is located in the Dowlat district of Tehran.

At the DBST, the German International Abitur after class 12, the upper-level entrance qualification or the secondary school qualification after class 10 and the secondary school qualification after class 9 can be acquired. The KMK checks the quality of the qualifications. A German-speaking kindergarten complements the educational offer.

The German School has an international department affiliated with it, which offers English-language lessons according to the IB system up to grade 8.

Eight foreign service teachers teach at the DBST along with 15 German-speaking local teachers and nine German-speaking kindergarten teachers teach in the German school. Around 300 pupils were taught in the school year 2020/21.

With a differentiated language concept, the DBST provides the prerequisites for the acquisition of active multilingualism. With English-language lessons and additional German lessons, the international department provides good conditions for acquiring the German International Abitur at this school or for transferring to an international school worldwide.

As a recognized German school abroad, the German Embassy School has been following the tradition of the German schools in Tehran since 1907. This work serves to maintain the partnership between Germany and the host country Iran.

History
A cultural agreement between Germany and Iran led to the establishment of the first German school in Tehran in 1907. It was subsidized by the German government and the Persian government and was well equipped with laboratories, a school kitchen, sports facilities, a boarding school for foreign students and a teacher's house. Initially 300 students were taught, the majority of whom were Persians. The school grew to 700 students by World War I. The teaching staff consisted of German and Persian teachers who taught either in German or Persian. Many graduates of the German school continued their studies in Germany and later held positions in higher administration in Iran or were significantly involved in the technical development of their home country.

The German-Persian educational policy led to the establishment of a German-Persian vocational school in 1925. It became a model for the establishment of further vocational schools in Iran.

In 1932, the German colony in Tehran opened a German school for German-speaking children. This school had to close in World War II after the German teachers were interned after the occupation of the Allies in 1941. The development of German-Iranian schools was interrupted by the two world wars and the associated political effects. It was not until 1955 that a German school, the DST, could be reopened in Tehran. This school began its teaching with initially 100 students from the German colony but grew quickly and in 1976 had almost 2,000 students from kindergarten to grade 13, making it the largest and most renowned German school abroad. The DST was entitled to take the school-leaving qualifications recognized in Germany and in 1964 carried out a German Abitur examination in Tehran for the first time. During this time, the school was relocated from the city center to the Yakhchal Street in the Gholhak province, where many Germans and Swiss lived.

A special cultural agreement also enabled gifted Iranian children from grade 5 and above to attend the German School in Tehran. They made up two thirds of the students in the upper school and received the best high school diplomas.

However, since the capacities of the DST were limited and the rush of students was high, the Iranian-German school was founded in 1975, in which German-Iranian children could get a qualified bilingual education. In the spring of 1980, the German school had to cease operations because the new regulations after the Islamic Revolution no longer allowed foreign schools to operate.

The school was once again relocated from the Gholhak province to the Residence of the British Embassy in the Shariati Street in the Dowlat district. The school closed for a few days after the attack on the British embassy on the 29th of November 2011 and the British embassy shut down their activities. Just a few months later after the summer vacation in September 1980, with the help of the German Embassy, the German Embassy School Tehran (DBST) was opened, offering classes for the remaining German-speaking children and other foreign children who wanted to attend a German school along with English language classes for the previous students of the BST.

Famous former students 
 Christopher Blenkinsop, Musician
Jasmin Tabatabai, Actress and singer
Sudabeh Mohafez, Writer/ Author

External links 
 Homepage of the German Embassy School Tehran
  German Embassy School Tehran
  (Archive)
  Freunde der Deutschen Schulen Teheran e.V. (FDDST)

See also

 Germany–Iran relations
 German Speaking Evangelical Church, Tehran

References

International schools in Tehran
Tehran
Germany–Iran relations
1980 establishments in Iran
Educational institutions established in 1980